This is a list of civil parishes in the ceremonial county of North Yorkshire, England, including Stockton-on-Tees (south of the river). There are 773 civil parishes, most of the county being parished.

Unparished areas include the former Harrogate Municipal Borough, except for Pannal and Burn Bridge, parts of the former Teesside County Borough, part of the former Scarborough Municipal Borough and the former York County Borough. For the part of the Borough of Stockton-on-Tees north of the River Tees, see List of civil parishes in County Durham.

Population figures are unavailable for some of the smallest parishes.

See also
 List of civil parishes in England

References

External links

 Office for National Statistics : Geographical Area Listings

North Yorkshire
 
Civil parishes